The Essential Santana is a compilation album by Santana, released on 22 October 2002. The collection is part of a series of Essential sets released by Columbia Records.

Uniquely among Santana compilations, "Soul Sacrifice" is included in the studio version from their first album, not the live performance from Woodstock.

The compilation contains no songs from the highly successful Supernatural album, despite it being released 3 years before this album. This is because Columbia and Santana's current label Arista Records were not under common ownership at the time. In 2013, Sony issued another "Essential Santana" 2-CD set which truncates the original's repertoire and does include music from the Arista era, as well as the live Woodstock version of "Soul Sacrifice".

Track listing

Disc one
"Jingo" (Babatunde Olatunji) – 4:22
"Evil Ways" (Clarence "Sonny" Henry) – 3:56
"Soul Sacrifice" (Carlos Santana, Gregg Rolie, David Brown, Marcus Malone) – 6:36
Tracks 1-3 from Santana, 1969
"Black Magic Woman/Gypsy Queen" (Peter Green/Gábor Szabó) – 5:19
"Oye Como Va" (Tito Puente) – 4:17
"Samba Pa Ti" (Santana) – 4:46
Tracks 4-6 from Abraxas, 1970
"Everybody's Everything" (Brown, Tyrone Moss, Santana) – 3:32
"No One to Depend On" (Michael Carabello, Coke Escovedo, Rolie) – 5:24
"Toussaint l'Overture" (José Areas, Brown, Carabello, Rolie, Santana, Michael Shrieve) – 5:56
"Guajira" (Areas, Brown, Rico Reyes) – 5:44
Tracks 7-10 from Santana III, 1971
"La Fuente del Ritmo" (Mingo Lewis) – 4:33
from Caravanserai, 1972
"In a Silent Way" (Joe Zawinul, Miles Davis) – 7:58
Live at the Fillmore West, San Francisco, California, July 4, 1971
Previously featured on the compilation Fillmore: The Last Days, 1972
"Love, Devotion and Surrender" (Richard Kermode, Santana) – 3:38
from Welcome, 1973
"Mirage" (Leon Patillo) – 4:43
from Borboletta, 1974
"Carnaval" (Tom Coster, Santana) – 2:15
"Let the Children Play" (Patillo, Santana) – 3:28
"Jugando" (Areas, Santana) – 2:12
Tracks 15-17 from Festivál, 1977

Disc two
"She's Not There" (Rod Argent) – 4:09
from Moonflower, 1977
"Dance Sister Dance (Baila Mi Hermana)" – (Leon "Ndugu" Chancler, Coster, David Rubinson) – 8:00
Live from Moonflower; originally from Amigos, 1976
"Europa (Earth's Cry Heaven's Smile)" (Coster, Santana) – 5:05
from Amigos, 1976
"Stormy" (Buddy Buie, James Cobb) – 4:47
"Well All Right" (Jerry Allison, Buddy Holly, Joe B. Mauldin, Norman Petty) – 4:09
"Open Invitation" (Dennis Lambert, David Margen, Brian Potter, Santana, Greg Walker) – 4:45
Tracks 4-6 from Inner Secrets, 1978
"Aqua Marine" (Alan Pasqua, Santana) – 5:35
"You Know That I Love You" (Alex Ligertwood, Pasqua, Santana, Chris Solberg) – 3:57
"All I Ever Wanted" (Ligertwood, Santana, Solberg) – 3:35
Tracks 7-9 from Marathon, 1979
"Winning" (Russ Ballard) – 3:29
from Zebop!, 1981
"Hold On" (Ian Thomas) – 4:36
"Nowhere to Run" (Ballard) – 2:53
Tracks 11-12 from Shangó, 1982
"Say It Again" (Val Garay, Steve Goldstein, Anthony LaPeau) – 3:28
from Beyond Appearances, 1985
"Veracruz" (Jeffrey Cohen, Buddy Miles, Rolie, Santana, Chester D. Thompson) – 3:46
from Freedom, 1987
"Blues for Salvador" (Santana, Thompson) – 5:57
from Blues for Salvador, 1987
"The Healer" (John Lee Hooker, Roy Rogers, Santana, Thompson) – 5:38
with John Lee Hooker; from The Healer, 1989

Certifications

References

2002 greatest hits albums
Santana (band) compilation albums
Columbia Records compilation albums